The Royal Opera House Muscat (ROHM) is Oman's premier venue for musical arts and culture. The opera house is located in Shati Al-Qurm district of Muscat on Sultan Qaboos Street. Built on the royal orders of Sultan Qaboos of Oman, the Royal Opera House reflects unique contemporary Omani architecture, and has a capacity to accommodate maximum of 1,100 people. The opera house complex consists of a concert theatre, auditorium, formal landscaped gardens, cultural market with retail, luxury restaurants and an art centre for musical, theatrical and operatic productions.

History
Sultan Qaboos bin Said Al Said, who was the ruler of Oman during the opera construction, had been always a fan of classical music and arts. In 2001, the sultan ordered the building of an opera house. Initially called 'House of Musical Arts', the name 'Royal Opera House Muscat (ROHM)' was finally chosen. This opera house, which was built by Carillion Alawi, became the first in the world equipped with Radio Marconi's multimedia interactive display seatback system, Mode23. It was officially opened on October 12, 2011, with a production of the opera Turandot, conducted by Spanish tenor Plácido Domingo.

Prominent guests
The opera house had an impressive first season, with performances by Plácido Domingo, Andrea Bocelli, and soprano Renée Fleming. There have also been music performances by world-renowned cellist Yo Yo Ma and the London Philharmonic Orchestra, the American Ballet Theatre in a production of Don Quixote, The Paul Taylor Dance Company, the performance of Swan Lake by the Mariinsky Ballet, and trumpeter Wynton Marsalis with New York city's Jazz at Lincoln Center Orchestra. There have been some Arab artists performing at the opera house as well such as Majida El Roumi as well as a tribute in honour of legendary Arab singer Um Kalthoum. In March 2013, Indian violin icon Dr L. Subramanyam performed at the opera house and described it as the only orchestra in the Middle East composed entirely of musicians from the region.

Gallery

References

External links

Royal Opera House Muscat official website 

2011 establishments in Oman
Theatres completed in 2011
Music venues completed in 2011
Opera houses in Oman
Buildings and structures in Muscat, Oman
Culture in Muscat, Oman
Tourist attractions in Muscat, Oman